The squirrel cuckoo (Piaya cayana) is a large and active species of cuckoo found in wooded habitats from northwestern Mexico to northern Argentina and Uruguay, and on Trinidad. Some authorities have split off the western Mexican form as the Mexican squirrel-cuckoo (Piaya mexicana).

Description

The adult has mainly chestnut upperparts and head, becoming paler on the throat. The lower breast is grey and the belly is blackish. The central tail feathers are rufous, but the outer are black with white tips. The bill is yellow and the iris is red. Immature birds have a grey bill and eyering, brown iris, and less white in the tail. It resembles the little cuckoo, but that species is smaller and has a darker throat.

There are a number of subspecies with minor plumage variations. For example, P. c. mehleri, one of the South American subspecies, has mainly brown (not black) outer tail feathers. Additionally, the subspecies from Mexico, Central America, and northern and western South America have a yellow eye-ring, but this is red in the remaining part of South America.

It makes explosive  and  calls, and the song is a whistled .

Habitat and behavior

This species’ English name derives from its habit of running along branches and leaping from branch to branch like a squirrel. It normally flies only short distances, mainly gliding with an occasional flap.

It feeds on large insects such as cicadas, wasps and caterpillars (including those with stinging hairs or spines), and occasionally spiders, small amphibians and reptiles, such as small lizards, rarely taking fruit. Its non-flying prey is typically taken off the foliage with a quick lunge, but wasps may be caught on the wing. Squirrel cuckoos are often observed to forage peacefully alongside small mammals such as common marmosets (Callithrix jacchus) during the dry season for cocoa beans. In particular, they can be seen to attend army ant columns together, picking off prey flushed by the ants, and occasionally will join mixed-species feeding flocks.

The female lays two white eggs.

The squirrel cuckoo is plentiful in most of its range and appears to be quite tolerant of human disturbance, as long as woodland remains. Compared to many cuckoos in the world, it is relatively bold and conspicuous, although it is most often encountered skulking about within vegetation. Owing to its wide range, it is considered a species of Least Concern by the IUCN.

References

Further reading

External links

 
 
 
 

squirrel cuckoo
Birds of Central America
Birds of South America
Birds of Trinidad and Tobago
squirrel cuckoo
squirrel cuckoo